Lady Megan Arvon Lloyd George,  (22 April 1902 – 14 May 1966) was a Welsh politician and the first female Member of Parliament (MP) for a Welsh constituency. She also served as Deputy Leader of the Liberal Party, before later becoming a Labour MP. In 2016, she was named as one of "the 50 greatest Welsh men and women of all time".

Background

She was the youngest child of David Lloyd George and his wife, Margaret, being born in 1902 in Criccieth, Caernarfonshire. Her name at birth was registered with forenames Megan Arvon and surname George, but she adopted her father's barrelled surname "Lloyd George". As her father was raised to the peerage as Earl Lloyd-George of Dwyfor in 1945, she gained the style of Lady Megan (Lloyd George).

Childhood 

Lloyd George was imaginative and "sprite-like" when young, and was described in the local press as a "daring sceptic", disliking her father's stories of Daniel in the lions' den. Around the age of five, she would travel with her father to their house in Brighton, and delight his guests by bringing them an early morning cup of tea while they were still in bed.

She began public engagements at an early age, and on 16 November 1910, at the age of eight, performed the opening ceremony of the extension of the Claremont Central Mission in Pentonville.

Liberal Party
Like her brother, Gwilym, she followed her father into politics. She became the first female MP in Wales when she won Anglesey for the Liberals in 1929.

Along with her father, she refused to support Ramsay MacDonald's National Government in 1931 and successfully held Anglesey as an opposition Liberal at the 1931 General Election. She held the seat again as a Liberal from 1935 to 1951.  During World War II, she was a member of Radical Action, which called for a more radical political stance and for the party to withdraw from the war-time electoral truce.

Throughout the 1940s and 1950s she campaigned for a Welsh Parliament and the creation of a Secretary of State for Wales. Prominent among the radicals in the Liberal Party, she opposed what she saw as the party's drift away from her father's brand of liberalism. During the late 1940s, Lady Megan (as she was universally known) remained on friendly terms with Clement Attlee and there were rumours that she would join the Labour Party.  In 1949, Lady Megan was elected Deputy Leader of the Liberal Party in a bid to create unity, but after losing her seat she stood down in 1952. Disillusioned with the Liberals, she indicated in November that year that she would not stand again in Anglesey.

Labour Party

In 1955, Lady Megan defected to the Labour Party. In 1957, she stood against the Liberals as the Labour Party candidate at a by-election in Carmarthen and won the seat, which she held until her death from breast cancer at Pwllheli in 1966, aged 64.

She was Philip Noel-Baker's romantic partner from 1936 until Irene Noel-Baker's death in 1956.

Awards and legacy
She was posthumously appointed as a Companion of Honour in the Dissolution Honours List published five days after her death.

In 2016 she was included in a list of "the 50 greatest Welsh men and women of all time".

In 2019 a Purple Plaque to commemorate her was installed on the building that had been her family home in Cricieth.

References

Sources

 Jones, J. Graham, entry in Dictionary of Liberal Biography Brack et al. (eds.) Politico's Publishing, 1998
 Jones, J. Graham, 'A breach in the family: the defection from the Liberal Party of Megan and Gwilym Lloyd George'
 Jones, Mervyn. A Radical Life: The Biography of Megan Lloyd George, 1902–66. London: Hutchinson, 1991. 
 Price, Emyr Megan Lloyd George; Gwynedd Archives Service, 1983

External links

 David Lloyd George Exhibition, National Library of Wales

1902 births
1966 deaths
Children of prime ministers of the United Kingdom
Deaths from breast cancer
People from Caernarfonshire
Liberal Party (UK) MPs for Welsh constituencies
Welsh Labour Party MPs
Female members of the Parliament of the United Kingdom for Welsh constituencies
Members of the Order of the Companions of Honour
Daughters of British earls
UK MPs 1929–1931
UK MPs 1931–1935
UK MPs 1935–1945
UK MPs 1945–1950
UK MPs 1950–1951
UK MPs 1955–1959
UK MPs 1959–1964
UK MPs 1964–1966
UK MPs 1966–1970
Deaths from cancer in Wales
Megan
20th-century British women politicians
Members of the Parliament of the United Kingdom for Carmarthenshire constituencies